The Europe/Africa Zone was one of the three zones of the regional Davis Cup competition in 1998.

In the Europe/Africa Zone there were four different tiers, called groups, in which teams competed against each other to advance to the upper tier. Winners in Group II advanced to the Europe/Africa Zone Group I. Teams who lost their respective ties competed in the relegation play-offs, with winning teams remaining in Group II, whereas teams who lost their play-offs were relegated to the Europe/Africa Zone Group III in 1999.

Participating nations

Draw

 and  promoted to Group I in 1999.

First round

Morocco vs. Bulgaria

Belarus vs. Luxembourg

Senegal vs. Poland

Ivory Coast vs. Egypt

Latvia vs. Yugoslavia

Portugal vs. Georgia

Monaco vs. Slovenia

Hungary vs. Ireland

Second round

Morocco vs. Belarus

Senegal vs. Ivory Coast

Yugoslavia vs. Portugal

Hungary vs. Slovenia

Relegation play-offs

Bulgaria vs. Luxembourg

Poland vs. Egypt

Latvia vs. Georgia

Ireland vs. Monaco

Third round

Ivory Coast vs. Belarus

Portugal vs. Hungary

References

External links
Davis Cup official website

Davis Cup Europe/Africa Zone
Europe Africa Zone Group II